Elachista dissona is a moth of the family Elachistidae that is found in Colorado.

The forewings are very narrow. The ground colour is greyish white, densely powdered with dark-tipped scales that form irregular stripes. The hindwings and underside of the wings are grey.

Etymology
The species name is derived from Latin dissonus (meaning discordant or different).

References

Moths described in 1997
dissona
Endemic fauna of Colorado
Moths of North America